Patrick McEleney (born 26 September 1992) is an Irish professional footballer who plays as a midfielder for Derry City in the League of Ireland Premier Division. He has previously played for Sunderland,  Oldham Athletic and Dundalk. McEleney has represented Dundalk and Derry City in European competition.

Club career

Sunderland
McEleney joined Sunderland from Foyle Harps on a scholarship in the summer of 2008. He signed a -year professional contract with the club in September 2008 and formed part of the under-18 and reserves teams which won their respective leagues that season under Kevin Ball. Both he and Everton youth team prospect, Shane Duffy, were granted a Civic Reception by the Mayor of Derry, Colr. Gerard Diver in the Guildhall in April 2009 to acknowledge their swift rise to prominence at their clubs. However, his time at the Stadium of Light was cut short as the player struggled with homesickness and the club agreed to release him from his contract.

Derry City
McEleney was one of the first four players signed by Stephen Kenny for Derry City following their relegation to the League of Ireland First Division, penning a two-year deal in December 2009. He was a key member of the Derry side that won the 2010 First Division title, scoring 12 league goals in 31 appearances, and he attracted interest from some English Premier League clubs and Celtic due to his performances. McEleney was nominated for the 2010 PFAI First Division Player of the Year award, ultimately losing out to Graham Cummins. McEleney was involved in a controversial incident in October 2010 when, 3 days after pulling out of the Republic of Ireland's Under 19 squad due to an ankle injury, he played and scored twice in a First Division fixture against Shelbourne. The League of Ireland Participation Agreement stated that if a player was not released for international duty, he could not play for his club during the five days after that duty. The FAI cleared Derry of any breach, however, declaring that "by the time [McEleney] had recovered from the injury, he was no longer required to fulfil his international duties and so he was eligible to play for Derry City."

In 2011, McEleney made a further 34 league appearances as Derry finished third on their return to the Premier Division. He also won the League Cup as Derry beat Cork 1–0 in the final at Turner's Cross. In May 2012, McEleney scored a penalty in the final of the Setanta Sports Cup against Crusaders, however Derry ultimately lost in the shootout. Later in the year he was a member of the team who won the FAI Cup on 4 November 2012, playing 59 minutes in their 3–2 defeat of St. Patrick's Athletic in the final.

McEleney featured in the UEFA Europa League with Derry City on a number of occasions. He played against Trabzonspor in the second qualifying round in 2013, and the following year he scored in Derry's 4–0 win over Aberystwyth Town in the first qualifying round. He also subsequently played against Shakhtyor Soligorsk in the second qualifying round. McEleney shone as Derry City reached the 2014 FAI Cup Final, however on this occasion they lost to St. Patrick's Athletic. He made his 200th appearance in all competitions for Derry in a 4–2 loss against Bohemians on 24 July 2015. At the end of 2015, McEleney was unable to agree a new deal with Derry and his contract expired.

Dundalk

Despite interest from Peterborough United, Brentford and St. Patrick's Athletic, McEleney signed a two-year deal with Dundalk in December 2015, linking up again with his former boss Stephen Kenny. He was primarily signed as a replacement for the departed Richie Towell who moved to Brighton and Hove Albion. Due to the fact that McEleney was under the age of 24 at the time, Dundalk had to pay a fee of €28,000 to Derry in compensation, a fee equal to one year of the player's gross salary. McEleney marked his home debut with a goal during a 3–0 defeat of Finn Harps. He picked up a groin injury after just his fourth game for the club and a hamstring injury sustained during his comeback put him out for longer, with McEleney noting that it took him until the mid-season break to gain full fitness. Following this, McEleney appeared in all six of Dundalk's UEFA Champions League qualifying ties, playing a particularly crucial role in the 3–0 defeat of BATE Borisov in the third qualifying round second leg after coming off the bench for the injured Ronan Finn and helping Dundalk qualify for the Europa League group stage. In the 2020 Europa League third qualifying round, he scored in the penalty shoot-out against Sheriff Tiraspol helping Dundalk qualify for the 2020–21 UEFA Europa League group stage. In the 2021-22 Europa Conference League 3rd round Qualifiers, He scored 2 goals to draw the game against Vitesse Arnhem.

Return to Derry City
It was announced on the 8th July 2021 that McEleney had signed a pre-contract to re-join his hometown club Derry City on a 2 year contract, commencing at the end of the season.

Career statistics

International career
McEleney played for the Northern Ireland Under-16 team before later representing the Republic of Ireland at youth level. He represented the Republic of Ireland at Under-17 level seven times and scored on his debut against Bulgaria in a 2–0 win at the Ovcha Kupel Stadium in August 2008. McEleney progressed to the Republic of Ireland Under-19 team in September 2009, making his debut against the Netherlands at the Carlisle Grounds in the Clarion Hotel Four-nation Tour. He went on to make a further 3 appearances for the Under-19s. Despite being contacted by Northern Ireland manager Michael O'Neill with a view to being called up to their senior squad, McEleney has indicated that his international future lies with the Republic of Ireland.

Personal life
McEleney is from the Shantallow area of Derry city. His father, Henry, was also a footballer, playing for Coleraine in the Irish League. Furthermore, McEleney's older brother, Shane, is a centre back and teammate of Patrick's at Derry City, having previously played for Finn Harps, Larne, Ottawa Fury & St Patrick's Athletic. Like Patrick, Shane has featured at youth level for the Republic of Ireland and recently switched allegiance to Northern Ireland, playing and scoring for the under-21 team in August 2012 against Hungary.

McEleney was a ballboy at Derry City in his youth. In 2015, an Italian football fan travelled 5,000 km to watch Derry City play and obtain McEleney's autograph after managing the club in PC videogame Football Manager.

Honours

Club
Derry City
League of Ireland First Division (1): 2010
League of Ireland Cup (1): 2011
FAI Cup (1): 2012 ,2022

Dundalk
 League of Ireland Premier Division (3): 2016, 2018, 2019
FAI Cup (2): 2018, 2020
League of Ireland Cup (2): 2017, 2019
President's Cup (2): 2019, 2021
Champions Cup (1): 2019

Individual
 PFAI Premier Division Team of the Year: 2016

References

External links
FAI Stats Portal Profile

Living people
1992 births
Derry City F.C. players
Dundalk F.C. players
League of Ireland players
Association footballers from Northern Ireland
Northern Ireland under-21 international footballers
Sportspeople from Derry (city)
Association football midfielders